Andres Pedroso (born February 21, 1979) is a former American tennis player.

Pedroso has a career high ATP singles ranking of 271 achieved on April 21, 2003. He also has a career high ATP doubles ranking of 255 achieved on August 16, 2004.

Pedroso has 1 ATP Challenger Tour title at the 2003 Torneo Internacional Challenger León.

External links

1979 births
Living people
American male tennis players
Sportspeople from New York City
Sportspeople from Coral Gables, Florida
Tennis people from Florida